Musa Pasha may refer to:

 Kara Musa Pasha (died 1649), Ottoman Kapudan Pasha (grand admiral) and grand vizier
 Musa Pasha ibn Hasan Ridwan (fl. 1663–1670), Ottoman governor of Gaza and Jerusalem
 Mūsā Pasha Ḥamdī (died 1865), Governor-General of the Sudan

See also
 Musa (name)
 Pasha